The 1974 NCAA Division I baseball tournament was played at the end of the 1974 NCAA Division I baseball season to determine the national champion of college baseball.  The tournament concluded with eight teams competing in the College World Series, a double-elimination tournament in its twenty-eighth year.  Eight regional districts sent representatives to the College World Series with preliminary rounds within each district serving to determine each representative.  These events would later become known as regionals.  Each district had its own format for selecting teams, resulting in 28 teams participating in the tournament at the conclusion of their regular season, and in some cases, after a conference tournament.  The twenty-eighth tournament's champion was Southern California, coached by Rod Dedeaux.  The Most Outstanding Player was George Milke of Southern California.

Tournament
The opening rounds of the tournament were played across eight district sites across the country, each consisting of between two and six teams. The winners of each District advanced to the College World Series.

Bold indicates winner.

District 1 at Cambridge, MA

District 2 at West Windsor, NJ

District 3 at Starkville, MS

District 4 at Minneapolis, MN

District 5 at Oklahoma City, OK

District 6 at Arlington, TX

District 7 at Greeley, CO

District 8 at Los Angeles, CA

College World Series

Participants

Results

Bracket

Game results

All-Tournament Team
The following players were members of the All-Tournament Team.

Notable players
 Harvard:
 Miami (FL): Orlando Gonzalez, Wayne Krenchicki
 Northern Colorado: Tom Runnells, Joe Strain
 Oklahoma: Keith Drumright, Bob Shirley
 Seton Hall: Rick Cerone, Charlie Puleo
 Southern California: Rich Dauer, Steve Kemp, Dennis Littlejohn, Bobby Mitchell, Ed Putman, Pete Redfern
 Southern Illinois:
 Texas: Bobby Cuellar, Jim Gideon, Keith Moreland, Rich Wortham

Tournament Notes
Southern California becomes the first team to win five consecutive College World Series.
Tom Petroff becomes the first head coach to lead two different schools to the College World Series; he led Rider University to Omaha in 1967.

See also
 1974 NCAA Division II baseball tournament
 1974 NAIA World Series

References

NCAA Division I Baseball Championship
1974 NCAA Division I baseball season
Baseball in the Dallas–Fort Worth metroplex